Tess of the d'Urbervilles is a 1913 American silent drama film based upon the Thomas Hardy 1891 novel of the same name and was one of the first feature films made. It was directed by J. Searle Dawley, released by Famous Players Film Company and stars Mrs. Fiske, reprising her famous role from the 1897 play. An Adolph Zukor feature production after securing the services of top American actress Mrs. Fiske.

A fragment of this film is said to exist.

Cast
Mrs. Fiske - Tess Durbeyfield
Raymond Bond - Angel Clare
David Torrence - Alec D'Urberville
John Steppling - John Durbyfield
Mary Barker - Mrs. Durbeyfield
James Gordon - Crick
Maggie Weston - Mrs. Crick
Irma La Pierre - Marian
Katherine Griffith - Mrs. D'Urberville
Franklin Hall - Parson Clare
Camille Dalberg - Mrs. Clare
J. Liston - Parson Tringham
Boots Wall - Reta
Caroline Darling - Izz
Justina Huff - Liza Lou
John Troughton - Jonathan

Reception
Like many American films of the time, Tess of the d'Urbervilles was subject to city and state film censorship boards. In 1917 the Chicago Board of Censors issued the film, due to its subject matter, an "adults only" permit.

See also
 Tess of the d'Urbervilles (1924)
 Tess (1979)
 Tess of the D'Urbervilles (2008 TV)
 List of Paramount Pictures films

References

External links
 
 
 Contemporary synopsis in Moving Picture News, Vol. VIII (August 2, 1913) at the Internet Archive

1913 films
American silent feature films
Lost American films
Films directed by J. Searle Dawley
Films based on Tess of the d'Urbervilles
American black-and-white films
Paramount Pictures films
1913 romantic drama films
American romantic drama films
1913 lost films
Lost romantic drama films
Censored films
1910s American films
Silent romantic drama films
Silent American drama films
1910s English-language films